Sozusa scutellata is a moth in the  subfamily Arctiinae. It was described by Wallengren in 1860. It is found in South Africa.

References

Natural History Museum Lepidoptera generic names catalog

Endemic moths of South Africa
Moths described in 1860
Lithosiina